A per capita GDP of $3,200 ranks Solomon Islands as a lesser developed nation. Over 75% of its labour force is engaged in subsistence farming and fishing.

Economic history 

Until 1998, when world prices for tropical timber fell steeply, timber was Solomon Islands main export product. In recent years, Solomon Islands forests were dangerously overexploited.

Solomon Islands was particularly hard hit by the Asian financial crisis even before the ethnic violence of June 2000. The Asian Development Bank estimates that the crash of the market for tropical timber reduced Solomon Island's GDP by between 15%-25%. About one-half of all jobs in the timber industry were lost. The government has said it will reform timber harvesting policies with the aim of resuming logging on a more sustainable basis.

In the wake of the ethnic violence in June 2000, exports of palm oil and gold ceased while exports of timber fell.

Economic sectors

Cash crops 
Important cash crops and exports include copra and palm oil.

Gold 
In 1998 gold production began at Gold Ridge on Guadalcanal.

Fishing 
Exploitation of Solomon Islands' rich fisheries offers the best prospect for further export and domestic economic expansion. A Japanese joint venture, Solomon Taiyo Ltd., which operated the only fish cannery in the country, closed in mid-2000 as a result of the ethnic disturbances. Though the plant has reopened under local management, the export of tuna has not resumed.

Tourism 

In 2017, Solomon Islands was one of the least frequently visited countries in the world, with only 26,000 tourists. Tourism income in 2016 and 2017 was about Int'l$ 1.6 million (international dollars). Tourism is a potentially significant service industry but growth is hampered by the lack of infrastructure, transportation limitations and security concerns. Scuba diving and World War II history are two major tourist attractions..

Foreign aid 
Since 2000 the Solomon Islands government has become increasingly insolvent. It has exhausted its borrowing capacity; in 2001 the deficit reached 8% of GDP. It is unable to meet bi-weekly payrolls and has become extraordinarily dependent on funds from foreign aid accounts, which provided an estimated 50% of government expenditure in 2001. Principal aid donors are Australia $247 Million per year (2006), New Zealand $14 Million per year (2004), the European Union, Japan $40 Million per year (2005), and the Republic of China (Taiwan) at least $20 Million per year .

Solomon Islands is a member of the WTO.

Energy 

Electricity - production:
78 GWh (2008 est.)

Electricity - consumption:
72.54 GWh (2008 est.)

Electricity - exports:
0 kWh (2009)

Electricity - imports:
0 kWh (2009)

A team of renewable energy developers working for the Pacific Islands Applied Geoscience Commission (SOPAC) and funded by the Renewable Energy and Energy Efficiency Partnership (REEEP), have hatched a scheme that enables these communities to access renewable energy, such as solar, without raising substantial sums of ready cash. If the islanders were not able to pay for solar lanterns with cash, reasoned the project developers, they can pay with crops

Statistics 

The following table shows the main economic indicators in 1980–2017.

Foreign Government Aid as a % of GDP:
40.125% (2006 est.)

GDP - per capita:
purchasing power parity - $3,200 (2011 est.)

GDP - composition by sector:
agriculture: 37.7%
industry: 6.4%
services: 55.9% (2011 est.)

Population below poverty line:
NA%

Household income or consumption by percentage share:
lowest 10%:
NA%
highest 10%:
NA%

Inflation rate (consumer prices):
10% (1999 est.)

Labor force:
202,500 (2007)

Labor force - by occupation:
agriculture 75%, industry 5%, services 20% (2000 est.)

Unemployment rate:
NA%

Budget:
revenues: $313.1 million
expenditures: $261.7 million, including capital expenditures of $0 (2011 est.)

Industries: 
fish (tuna), mining, timber

Industrial production growth rate:
NA%

Agriculture - products:
cocoa, coconuts, palm kernels, rice, potatoes, vegetables, fruit; cattle, pigs; fish; timber

Exports:
$216.5 million (2010 est.)

Exports - commodities:
timber, fish, palm oil, cocoa, copra

Exports - partners:
China 54%, Australia 12.5%, Thailand 4.6% (2011)

Imports:
$360.3 million (2010 est.)

Imports - commodities:
food, plant and equipment, manufactured goods, fuels, chemicals

Imports - partners:
Australia 27.3%, Singapore 26.4%, China 6.5%, Malaysia 5.1%, New Zealand 5.1% (2011)

Debt - external:
$166 million (2004)

Currency:
1 Solomon Islands dollar (SI$) = 100 cents

Exchange rates:
Solomon Islands dollars (SI$) per US$1 – 7.833 (January 2017)

Fiscal year:
calendar year

References 

 
Solomon Islands